Santyrsky is a rural locality (a khutor) in Mikhaylovskoye Rural Settlement, Uryupinsky District, Volgograd Oblast, Russia. The population was 84 as of 2010.

Geography 
Santyrsky is located in forest steppe, 24 km north of Uryupinsk (the district's administrative centre) by road. Skabelinsky is the nearest rural locality.

References 

Rural localities in Uryupinsky District